Route 342 is a provincial highway located in the Montérégie region of Quebec west of Montreal. It runs from the Ontario-Quebec border in Pointe-Fortune (at the junctions of Ontario Highway 417 and Autoroute 40 and ends in Vaudreuil-Dorion at the junction of Autoroute 20. Before the construction of Autoroute 40 in 1959 (and its continuation in Ontario as Highway 417) it was the main route between Montreal, Quebec and Ottawa, Ontario (becoming Route 17 in Ontario). It serves as an alternate route to Autoroute 40 and has 4 interchanges with it in Pointe-Fortune, Rigaud and Hudson.

Municipalities along Route 342
 Pointe-Fortune
 Rigaud
 Hudson
 Saint-Lazare
 Vaudreuil-Dorion

Major intersections

See also
 List of Quebec provincial highways

References

External links 
 Transports Quebec Official Road Map 
 Route 342 on Google Maps

342